Spencer Jones may refer to the following:


People

Full name
Spencer Cone Jones (1836–1915), American politician from Maryland
Spencer P. Jones (born 1956), New Zealand guitar player
Spencer Jones (pitcher) (born 1994), American baseball player
Spencer Jones (outfielder) (born 2001), American baseball player
Spencer Jones (comedian), English comedian and actor
Spencer Jones (rugby union) (born 1997), New Zealand-born Canadian rugby union player

Surname
Harold Spencer Jones (1890–1960), English astronomer

Other uses
3282 Spencer Jones, an asteroid
Spencer Jones (crater), a lunar impact crater